

Offseason
 December 17, 1990: Danny Cox was signed as a free agent by the Phillies.
January 11, 1991: Jim Lindeman was signed as a free agent by the Phillies.

Regular season
On April 28, 1991, the Phillies recorded the first triple play in the history of Veterans Stadium. Tony Gwynn lined to second baseman Randy Ready. Ready stepped on second, and although he could have tagged the runner, threw to first baseman Ricky Jordan.

On May 6, 1991, Lenny Dykstra slammed his Mercedes-Benz red sports car into two trees while driving home from a bachelor party. Dykstra, suffered three broken ribs, a broken right collarbone and a broken right cheekbone. A broken rib punctured a lung and his heart was bruised, according to doctors. Phillies' catcher Darren Daulton was also in the car with Dykstra. Daulton suffered a broken left eye socket, a scratched left cornea and a heart bruise, doctors said.

On May 23, 1991, Tommy Greene threw a no-hitter against the Montreal Expos in Montreal. Greene was starting for only the second time in the season and 15th time in his major league career. He became the first visiting pitcher to hurl a no-hitter in Montreal's history as the Phillies defeated the Expos, 2–0 before an Olympic Stadium crowd of 8,833. Greene was pitching in place of Danny Cox who had suffered a pulled groin in his last start. Greene walked seven batters but also struck out 10.

Playing against the Cincinnati Reds on June 14, 1991, Von Hayes was hit by a pitch by Tom Browning which broke his arm. Hayes returned to action on September 6, 1991, against Houston. Hayes was traded to the California Angels in the off-season but Hayes would later cite Browning's pitch as ending his career, "I broke my arm when I was hit by a pitch from Tom Browning... and I was finished. I tried to make a comeback (with California) in 1992, but it was no good."

From July 30 to August 12, the Phillies won 13 straight games, tying the franchise record (in the modern era) set by the 1977 Phillies. The Phillies swept the Montreal Expos twice during the streak and made up nine games in the standings. The streak also helped them move from last place in the NL East to third by season's end.

It was also the most strikeouts ever recorded by a pitcher at Veterans Stadium. The Mets won the game 7–0.

Notable transactions
 April 7, 1991: Chuck McElroy and Bob Scanlan were traded by the Phillies to the Chicago Cubs for Mitch Williams.
 April 10, 1991: Rick Schu was signed as a free agent by the Phillies.
 July 21, 1991: Ricky Bottalico was signed by the Phillies as an amateur free agent.

Season standings

Record vs. opponents

1991 Game Log

|- style="background:#fbb"
| 1 || April 8 || @ Mets || 1–2 || Dwight Gooden (1–0) || Terry Mulholland (0–1) || John Franco (1) || 49,276 || 0–1
|- style="background:#fbb"
| 2 || April 9 || @ Mets || 1–2 (10) || Doug Simons (1–0) || Joe Boever (0–1) || None || 16,013 || 0–2
|- style="background:#bfb"
| 3 || April 10 || @ Mets || 8–7 (10) || Roger McDowell (1–0) || Jeff Innis (0–1) || Mitch Williams (1) || 22,841 || 1–2
|- style="background:#bfb"
| 4 || April 12 || Cardinals || 11–4 || Pat Combs (1–0) || Jamie Moyer (0–1) || None || 38,227 || 2–2
|- style="background:#bfb"
| 5 || April 13 || Cardinals || 4–2 || Terry Mulholland (1–1) || Bob Tewksbury (0–1) || Mitch Williams (2) || 15,485 || 3–2
|- style="background:#fbb"
| 6 || April 14 || Cardinals || 7–11 || Bryn Smith (2–0) || Dave LaPoint (0–1) || Lee Smith (3) || 20,337 || 3–3
|- style="background:#fbb"
| 7 || April 15 || @ Cubs || 4–5 || Greg Maddux (2–0) || Jason Grimsley (0–1) || Dave Smith (3) || 27,794 || 3–4
|- style="background:#fbb"
| 8 || April 16 || @ Cubs || 3–4 (13) || Mike Bielecki (2–0) || Mitch Williams (0–1) || None || 11,571 || 3–5
|- style="background:#fbb"
| 9 || April 17 || @ Cubs || 1–4 || Shawn Boskie (1–1) || Pat Combs (1–1) || Dave Smith (4) || 13,680 || 3–6
|- style="background:#bbb"
| – || April 18 || Cardinals || colspan=6 | Postponed (rain); Makeup: April 20 as a traditional double-header
|- style="background:#fbb"
| 10 || April 19 || Cardinals || 1–3 || Bob Tewksbury (1–1) || Terry Mulholland (1–2) || Lee Smith (5) || 21,468 || 3–7
|- style="background:#fbb"
| 11 || April 20 (1) || Cardinals || 1–12 || José DeLeón (1–1) || Jason Grimsley (0–2) || Omar Olivares (1) || see 2nd game || 3–8
|- style="background:#bfb"
| 12 || April 20 (2) || Cardinals || 6–5 (10) || Roger McDowell (2–0) || Cris Carpenter (1–1) || Mitch Williams (3) || 27,482 || 4–8
|- style="background:#fbb"
| 13 || April 21 || Cardinals || 6–7 (10) || Lee Smith (1–0) || Mitch Williams (0–2) || None || 26,701 || 4–9
|- style="background:#fbb"
| 14 || April 23 || Mets || 1–2 || Ron Darling (1–1) || Jason Grimsley (0–3) || John Franco (4) || 20,187 || 4–10
|- style="background:#fbb"
| 15 || April 24 || Mets || 3–7 || Pete Schourek (1–0) || Darrel Akerfelds (0–1) || None || 15,214 || 4–11
|- style="background:#bfb"
| 16 || April 25 || Mets || 5–3 || Roger McDowell (3–0) || Doug Simons (1–1) || Mitch Williams (4) || 22,099 || 5–11
|- style="background:#fbb"
| 17 || April 26 || Padres || 0–4 || Bruce Hurst (2–0) || José DeJesús (0–1) || None || 19,363 || 5–12
|- style="background:#bfb"
| 18 || April 27 || Padres || 4–3 (12) || Darrel Akerfelds (1–1) || Mike Maddux (2–1) || None || 20,334 || 6–12
|- style="background:#bfb"
| 19 || April 28 || Padres || 9–2 || Jason Grimsley (1–3) || Eric Nolte (3–1) || None || 39,332 || 7–12
|- style="background:#bfb"
| 20 || April 29 || Padres || 7–2 || Terry Mulholland (2–2) || Ed Whitson (1–3) || None || 12,359 || 8–12
|- style="background:#bfb"
| 21 || April 30 || Giants || 11–9 || Joe Boever (1–1) || Jeff Brantley (0–1) || Mitch Williams (5) || 15,500 || 9–12
|-

|- style="background:#bfb"
| 22 || May 1 || Giants || 4–1 || Tommy Greene (1–0) || Mike LaCoss (1–2) || Roger McDowell (1) || 17,281 || 10–12
|- style="background:#fbb"
| 23 || May 3 || Dodgers || 1–7 || Ramón Martínez (4–1) || Danny Cox (0–1) || None || 29,364 || 10–13
|- style="background:#bfb"
| 24 || May 4 || Dodgers || 4–3 || Terry Mulholland (3–2) || Jay Howell (0–1) || Mitch Williams (6) || 30,106 || 11–13
|- style="background:#fbb"
| 25 || May 5 || Dodgers || 2–3 || Mike Morgan (3–2) || Joe Boever (1–2) || Jay Howell (2) || 44,160 || 11–14
|- style="background:#fbb"
| 26 || May 7 || @ Padres || 2–4 || Bruce Hurst (4–0) || José DeJesús (0–2) || Craig Lefferts (7) || 23,172 || 11–15
|- style="background:#bfb"
| 27 || May 8 || @ Padres || 5–2 || Danny Cox (1–1) || Andy Benes (0–4) || Roger McDowell (2) || 12,063 || 12–15
|- style="background:#bfb"
| 28 || May 9 || @ Padres || 9–6 || Terry Mulholland (4–2) || Derek Lilliquist (0–2) || Mitch Williams (7) || 43,153 || 13–15
|- style="background:#fbb"
| 29 || May 10 || @ Dodgers || 1–3 || Bob Ojeda (2–3) || Joe Boever (1–3) || John Candelaria (2) || 44,255 || 13–16
|- style="background:#fbb"
| 30 || May 11 || @ Dodgers || 2–3 || Mike Morgan (4–2) || Pat Combs (1–2) || Jay Howell (4) || 40,335 || 13–17
|- style="background:#bfb"
| 31 || May 12 || @ Dodgers || 7–3 || José DeJesús (1–2) || Tim Belcher (3–4) || None || 33,208 || 14–17
|- style="background:#bfb"
| 32 || May 13 || @ Giants || 3–2 (11) || Joe Boever (2–3) || Rod Beck (0–1) || None || 7,901 || 15–17
|- style="background:#bfb"
| 33 || May 14 || @ Giants || 9–0 || Terry Mulholland (5–2) || Kelly Downs (1–2) || None || 8,656 || 16–17
|- style="background:#fbb"
| 34 || May 15 || @ Giants || 2–4 || Bud Black (4–3) || Jason Grimsley (1–4) || Jeff Brantley (3) || 12,661 || 16–18
|- style="background:#bfb"
| 35 || May 17 || Cubs || 1–0 (16) || Tommy Greene (2–0) || Les Lancaster (0–1) || None || 28,044 || 17–18
|- style="background:#bfb"
| 36 || May 18 || Cubs || 5–2 || Joe Boever (3–3) || Paul Assenmacher (2–1) || Mitch Williams (8) || 34,877 || 18–18
|- style="background:#fbb"
| 37 || May 19 || Cubs || 1–2 (10) || Mike Bielecki (5–2) || Roger McDowell (3–1) || Dave Smith (10) || 27,830 || 18–19
|- style="background:#fbb"
| 38 || May 21 || @ Expos || 0–3 || Dennis Martínez (6–3) || Jason Grimsley (1–5) || None || 12,002 || 18–20
|- style="background:#bfb"
| 39 || May 22 || @ Expos || 8–1 || Pat Combs (2–2) || Brian Barnes (0–2) || None || 15,331 || 19–20
|- style="background:#bfb"
| 40 || May 23 || @ Expos || 2–0 || Tommy Greene (3–0) || Oil Can Boyd (2–5) || None || 8,833 || 20–20
|- style="background:#fbb"
| 41 || May 24 || @ Pirates || 1–9 || Zane Smith (6–2) || Terry Mulholland (5–3) || None || 29,770 || 20–21
|- style="background:#fbb"
| 42 || May 25 || @ Pirates || 2–4 (11) || Vicente Palacios (3–2) || Joe Boever (3–4) || None || 24,358 || 20–22
|- style="background:#fbb"
| 43 || May 26 || @ Pirates || 2–5 || John Smiley (7–1) || Jason Grimsley (1–6) || Bill Landrum (7) || 26,117 || 20–23
|- style="background:#fbb"
| 44 || May 27 || Expos || 1–8 || Chris Nabholz (2–3) || Pat Combs (2–3) || None || 18,028 || 20–24
|- style="background:#bfb"
| 45 || May 28 || Expos || 12–0 || Tommy Greene (4–0) || Oil Can Boyd (2–6) || None || 16,850 || 21–24
|- style="background:#bfb"
| 46 || May 29 || Expos || 2–1 || Terry Mulholland (6–3) || Barry Jones (2–2) || Mitch Williams (9) || 30,828 || 22–24
|- style="background:#fbb"
| 47 || May 31 || Pirates || 1–5 || Bob Walk (1–0) || Jason Grimsley (1–7) || None || 25,652 || 22–25
|-

|- style="background:#fbb"
| 48 || June 1 || Pirates || 3–5 || John Smiley (8–1) || Pat Combs (2–4) || Bill Landrum (9) || 31,601 || 22–26
|- style="background:#fbb"
| 49 || June 2 || Pirates || 3–5 || Bob Walk (2–0) || Mitch Williams (0–3) || Bob Patterson (1) || 36,185 || 22–27
|- style="background:#fbb"
| 50 || June 4 || @ Braves || 5–9 || Tom Glavine (9–2) || Terry Mulholland (6–4) || None || 30,165 || 22–28
|- style="background:#bfb"
| 51 || June 5 || @ Braves || 12–11 (12) || Darrel Akerfelds (2–1) || Jeff Parrett (0–2) || José DeJesús (1) || 16,937 || 23–28
|- style="background:#fbb"
| 52 || June 6 || @ Braves || 4–9 || Charlie Leibrandt (5–4) || Pat Combs (2–5) || None || 15,682 || 23–29
|- style="background:#bfb"
| 53 || June 7 || @ Reds || 5–4 || Tommy Greene (5–0) || Jack Armstrong (4–5) || Mitch Williams (10) || 35,827 || 24–29
|- style="background:#bfb"
| 54 || June 8 || @ Reds || 4–1 || José DeJesús (2–2) || Chris Hammond (3–5) || Roger McDowell (3) || 37,457 || 25–29
|- style="background:#fbb"
| 55 || June 9 || @ Reds || 3–6 || Tom Browning (8–4) || Terry Mulholland (6–5) || Rob Dibble (15) || 29,748 || 25–30
|- style="background:#fbb"
| 56 || June 10 || @ Reds || 3–9 || José Rijo (5–2) || Andy Ashby (0–1) || None || 27,567 || 25–31
|- style="background:#fbb"
| 57 || June 11 || @ Astros || 0–1 (11) || Al Osuna (2–2) || Roger McDowell (3–2) || None || 7,953 || 25–32
|- style="background:#fbb"
| 58 || June 12 || @ Astros || 2–3 || Al Osuna (3–2) || Joe Boever (3–5) || None || 8,374 || 25–33
|- style="background:#bfb"
| 59 || June 13 || @ Astros || 5–4 || José DeJesús (3–2) || Darryl Kile (0–2) || Mitch Williams (11) || 14,362 || 26–33
|- style="background:#fbb"
| 60 || June 14 || Reds || 2–4 || Tom Browning (9–4) || Terry Mulholland (6–6) || Rob Dibble (17) || 26,067 || 26–34
|- style="background:#fbb"
| 61 || June 15 || Reds || 1–3 || José Rijo (6–2) || Andy Ashby (0–2) || Rob Dibble (18) || 32,075 || 26–35
|- style="background:#fbb"
| 62 || June 16 || Reds || 6–8 || Randy Myers (3–4) || Roger McDowell (3–3) || Don Carman (1) || 41,905 || 26–36
|- style="background:#bfb"
| 63 || June 17 || Braves || 4–3 || Mitch Williams (1–3) || Juan Berenguer (0–2) || None || 18,517 || 27–36
|- style="background:#bfb"
| 64 || June 18 || Braves || 8–4 || José DeJesús (4–2) || Pete Smith (1–1) || None || 12,405 || 28–36
|- style="background:#fbb"
| 65 || June 19 || Braves || 2–9 || Tom Glavine (11–3) || Terry Mulholland (6–7) || None || 23,989 || 28–37
|- style="background:#bfb"
| 66 || June 20 || Astros || 7–3 || Danny Cox (2–1) || Jimmy Jones (4–5) || None || 23,415 || 29–37
|- style="background:#bfb"
| 67 || June 21 || Astros || 3–0 || Bruce Ruffin (1–0) || Mark Portugal (6–3) || Mitch Williams (12) || 21,120 || 30–37
|- style="background:#fbb"
| 68 || June 22 || Astros || 3–4 (10) || Al Osuna (4–2) || Roger McDowell (3–4) || Mike Capel (2) || 25,506 || 30–38
|- style="background:#fbb"
| 69 || June 23 || Astros || 4–6 || Darryl Kile (1–2) || José DeJesús (4–3) || Jim Clancy (3) || 23,455 || 30–39
|- style="background:#fbb"
| 70 || June 25 || @ Cardinals || 9–10 || Scott Terry (2–1) || Roger McDowell (3–5) || Lee Smith (19) || 30,798 || 30–40
|- style="background:#fbb"
| 71 || June 26 || @ Cardinals || 1–14 || Bryn Smith (6–4) || Pat Combs (2–6) || None || 25,706 || 30–41
|- style="background:#fbb"
| 72 || June 27 || @ Cardinals || 2–4 || Ken Hill (7–5) || Tommy Greene (5–1) || Lee Smith (20) || 26,419 || 30–42
|- style="background:#bfb"
| 73 || June 28 || @ Mets || 6–2 || José DeJesús (5–3) || Ron Darling (4–5) || None || 33,511 || 31–42
|- style="background:#fbb"
| 74 || June 29 || @ Mets || 0–5 || Wally Whitehurst (4–4) || Terry Mulholland (6–8) || None || 46,244 || 31–43
|- style="background:#bfb"
| 75 || June 30 || @ Mets || 10–9 || Danny Cox (3–1) || Dwight Gooden (7–6) || Mitch Williams (13) || 44,310 || 32–43
|-

|- style="background:#fbb"
| 76 || July 1 || Cardinals || 0–1 || Bryn Smith (7–4) || Bruce Ruffin (1–1) || Lee Smith (21) || 17,281 || 32–44
|- style="background:#fbb"
| 77 || July 2 || Cardinals || 1–6 || Ken Hill (8–5) || Tommy Greene (5–2) || Lee Smith (22) || 16,847 || 32–45
|- style="background:#fbb"
| 78 || July 3 || Cardinals || 3–4 || Omar Olivares (2–1) || José DeJesús (5–4) || Lee Smith (23) || 50,156 || 32–46
|- style="background:#bfb"
| 79 || July 4 || Cardinals || 7–1 || Terry Mulholland (7–8) || Bob Tewksbury (6–5) || None || 14,921 || 33–46
|- style="background:#fbb"
| 80 || July 5 || Mets || 1–3 || Dwight Gooden (8–6) || Danny Cox (3–2) || John Franco (18) || 51,314 || 33–47
|- style="background:#fbb"
| 81 || July 6 || Mets || 1–2 || Frank Viola (10–5) || Bruce Ruffin (1–2) || John Franco (19) || 35,067 || 33–48
|- style="background:#fbb"
| 82 || July 7 || Mets || 2–8 || David Cone (8–5) || Tommy Greene (5–3) || None || 35,444 || 33–49
|- style="background:#bbcaff;"
| – || July 9 ||colspan="7" |1991 Major League Baseball All-Star Game at SkyDome in Toronto
|- style="background:#bfb"
| 83 || July 11 || Giants || 3–2 || Terry Mulholland (8–8) || Trevor Wilson (4–8) || Mitch Williams (14) || 22,355 || 34–49
|- style="background:#bfb"
| 84 || July 12 || Giants || 1–0 || Tommy Greene (6–3) || Bud Black (6–8) || Mitch Williams (15) || 21,221 || 35–49
|- style="background:#fbb"
| 85 || July 13 || Giants || 5–7 || Francisco Oliveras (4–2) || Wally Ritchie (0–1) || Dave Righetti (12) || 23,017 || 35–50
|- style="background:#fbb"
| 86 || July 14 || Giants || 5–17 || Kelly Downs (5–4) || Danny Cox (3–3) || None || 28,338 || 35–51
|- style="background:#bfb"
| 87 || July 15 || Dodgers || 9–8 || Steve Searcy (2–2) || Tim Crews (2–2) || Mitch Williams (16) || 31,262 || 36–51
|- style="background:#bfb"
| 88 || July 16 || Dodgers || 3–1 || Terry Mulholland (9–8) || Bob Ojeda (7–7) || None || 28,622 || 37–51
|- style="background:#bfb"
| 89 || July 17 || Dodgers || 4–2 || Tommy Greene (7–3) || John Candelaria (0–1) || Mitch Williams (17) || 33,651 || 38–51
|- style="background:#bfb"
| 90 || July 19 || @ Padres || 4–1 || José DeJesús (6–4) || Dennis Rasmussen (3–6) || Mitch Williams (18) || 21,621 || 39–51
|- style="background:#bfb"
| 91 || July 20 || @ Padres || 4–0 || Bruce Ruffin (2–2) || Greg W. Harris (2–2) || None || 15,882 || 40–51
|- style="background:#fbb"
| 92 || July 21 || @ Padres || 2–5 || Bruce Hurst (11–5) || Terry Mulholland (9–9) || None || 18,053 || 40–52
|- style="background:#fbb"
| 93 || July 23 || @ Dodgers || 5–6 (10) || Jay Howell (3–2) || Roger McDowell (3–6) || None || 48,925 || 40–53
|- style="background:#fbb"
| 94 || July 24 || @ Dodgers || 1–2 || John Candelaria (1–1) || Steve Searcy (2–3) || None || 36,127 || 40–54
|- style="background:#fbb"
| 95 || July 25 || @ Dodgers || 0–5 || Ramón Martínez (13–5) || Bruce Ruffin (2–3) || None || 39,626 || 40–55
|- style="background:#fbb"
| 96 || July 26 || @ Giants || 2–3 || Kelly Downs (6–4) || Terry Mulholland (9–10) || Dave Righetti (14) || 15,083 || 40–56
|- style="background:#fbb"
| 97 || July 27 || @ Giants || 0–3 || Paul McClellan (1–0) || Danny Cox (3–4) || Dave Righetti (15) || 26,132 || 40–57
|- style="background:#fbb"
| 98 || July 28 || @ Giants || 1–2 || Bud Black (8–8) || Tommy Greene (7–4) || Jeff Brantley (9) || 36,268 || 40–58
|- style="background:#bfb"
| 99 || July 30 || Padres || 2–1 || José DeJesús (7–4) || Dennis Rasmussen (3–8) || Mitch Williams (19) || 22,946 || 41–58
|- style="background:#bfb"
| 100 || July 31 || Padres || 9–3 || Bruce Ruffin (3–3) || Greg W. Harris (2–3) || None || 24,779 || 42–58
|-

|- style="background:#bfb"
| 101 || August 1 || @ Expos || 4–1 || Terry Mulholland (10–10) || Mark Gardner (5–8) || None || 24,953 || 43–58
|- style="background:#bfb"
| 102 || August 2 || @ Expos || 6–5 (11) || Mitch Williams (2–3) || Mel Rojas (0–3) || Mike Hartley (2) || 18,638 || 44–58
|- style="background:#bfb"
| 103 || August 3 || @ Expos || 7–1 || Tommy Greene (8–4) || Brian Barnes (2–4) || None || 21,939 || 45–58
|- style="background:#bfb"
| 104 || August 4 || @ Expos || 3–2 (10) || Mitch Williams (3–3) || Jeff Fassero (1–2) || None || 17,976 || 46–58
|- style="background:#bfb"
| 105 || August 6 || Cubs || 6–2 (11) || Mitch Williams (4–3) || Les Lancaster (7–5) || None || 26,562 || 47–58
|- style="background:#bfb"
| 106 || August 7 || Cubs || 5–4 (11) || Mitch Williams (5–3) || Les Lancaster (7–6) || None || 26,294 || 48–58
|- style="background:#bfb"
| 107 || August 8 || Cubs || 11–1 || Danny Cox (4–4) || Danny Jackson (1–3) || None || 32,232 || 49–58
|- style="background:#bfb"
| 108 || August 9 || Expos || 5–4 || Mitch Williams (6–3) || Dave Wainhouse (0–1) || None || 13,297 || 50–58
|- style="background:#bfb"
| 109 || August 10 || Expos || 4–2 || José DeJesús (8–4) || Scott Ruskin (3–3) || Mitch Williams (20) || 31,006 || 51–58
|- style="background:#bfb"
| 110 || August 11 || Expos || 5–4 || Mike Hartley (3–0) || Jeff Fassero (1–3) || Mitch Williams (21) || 35,274 || 52–58
|- style="background:#bfb"
| 111 || August 12 || Expos || 2–1 || Terry Mulholland (11–10) || Dennis Martínez (11–7) || None || 31,001 || 53–58
|- style="background:#fbb"
| 112 || August 13 || @ Pirates || 3–4 || Doug Drabek (11–11) || Danny Cox (4–5) || Stan Belinda (10) || 22,584 || 53–59
|- style="background:#fbb"
| 113 || August 14 || @ Pirates || 3–5 || John Smiley (14–8) || Tommy Greene (8–5) || Stan Belinda (11) || 42,501 || 53–60
|- style="background:#bfb"
| 114 || August 15 || @ Pirates || 6–4 || José DeJesús (9–4) || Neal Heaton (3–2) || Mitch Williams (22) || 28,193 || 54–60
|- style="background:#fbb"
| 115 || August 16 || @ Cubs || 1–9 || Rick Sutcliffe (3–4) || Bruce Ruffin (3–4) || None || 34,547 || 54–61
|- style="background:#bfb"
| 116 || August 17 || @ Cubs || 5–2 || Terry Mulholland (12–10) || Mike Bielecki (11–8) || Mitch Williams (23) || 33,223 || 55–61
|- style="background:#fbb"
| 117 || August 18 || @ Cubs || 6–7 (10) || Paul Assenmacher (6–4) || Mitch Williams (6–4) || None || 32,801 || 55–62
|- style="background:#bfb"
| 118 || August 20 || Pirates || 6–5 || Steve Searcy (3–3) || Stan Belinda (3–4) || None || 23,336 || 56–62
|- style="background:#bfb"
| 119 || August 21 || Pirates || 6–5 || Mitch Williams (7–4) || Bob Kipper (2–2) || None || 35,591 || 57–62
|- style="background:#bfb"
| 120 || August 22 || Pirates || 4–3 (11) || Mitch Williams (8–4) || Bill Landrum (1–3) || None || 41,544 || 58–62
|- style="background:#fbb"
| 121 || August 23 || @ Braves || 2–4 || Tom Glavine (16–8) || Terry Mulholland (12–11) || Mark Wohlers (2) || 43,161 || 58–63
|- style="background:#bfb"
| 122 || August 24 || @ Braves || 6–5 || Mitch Williams (9–4) || Tony Castillo (1–1) || None || 43,966 || 59–63
|- style="background:#bfb"
| 123 || August 25 || @ Braves || 6–5 || Tommy Greene (9–5) || Steve Avery (13–8) || Mitch Williams (24) || 26,027 || 60–63
|- style="background:#fbb"
| 124 || August 26 || @ Reds || 4–5 || Kip Gross (6–4) || Mike Hartley (3–1) || Rob Dibble (25) || 18,683 || 60–64
|- style="background:#fbb"
| 125 || August 27 || @ Reds || 2–4 || Scott Scudder (5–4) || Bruce Ruffin (3–5) || Rob Dibble (26) || 17,787 || 60–65
|- style="background:#bfb"
| 126 || August 28 || Astros || 11–10 (10) || Mike Hartley (4–1) || Al Osuna (7–4) || None || 24,981 || 61–65
|- style="background:#fbb"
| 127 || August 29 || Astros || 1–5 || Mark Portugal (10–6) || Danny Cox (4–6) || None || 20,321 || 61–66
|- style="background:#fbb"
| 128 || August 30 || Braves || 1–6 || Steve Avery (14–8) || Tommy Greene (9–6) || None || 22,708 || 61–67
|- style="background:#bfb"
| 129 || August 31 || Braves || 5–0 || José DeJesús (10–4) || Armando Reynoso (2–1) || None || 30,259 || 62–67
|-

|- style="background:#bfb"
| 130 || September 1 || Braves || 5–4 (10) || Mitch Williams (10–4) || Mark Wohlers (1–1) || None || 25,141 || 63–67
|- style="background:#bfb"
| 131 || September 2 || Reds || 8–5 || Terry Mulholland (13–11) || Tom Browning (13–9) || Mitch Williams (25) || 15,175 || 64–67
|- style="background:#fbb"
| 132 || September 3 || Reds || 5–8 || José Rijo (12–4) || Cliff Brantley (0–1) || Rob Dibble (28) || 15,565 || 64–68
|- style="background:#fbb"
| 133 || September 4 || Reds || 1–5 || Randy Myers (6–12) || Tommy Greene (9–7) || None || 15,962 || 64–69
|- style="background:#fbb"
| 134 || September 6 || @ Astros || 1–3 || Pete Harnisch (9–8) || José DeJesús (10–5) || Al Osuna (11) || 7,868 || 64–70
|- style="background:#fbb"
| 135 || September 7 || @ Astros || 0–6 || Darryl Kile (7–9) || Bruce Ruffin (3–6) || None || 12,952 || 64–71
|- style="background:#bfb"
| 136 || September 8 || @ Astros || 5–0 || Terry Mulholland (14–11) || Ryan Bowen (4–3) || None || 7,847 || 65–71
|- style="background:#fbb"
| 137 || September 9 || @ Cardinals || 2–4 || Omar Olivares (8–5) || Andy Ashby (0–3) || Lee Smith (38) || 16,597 || 65–72
|- style="background:#bfb"
| 138 || September 10 || @ Cardinals || 5–2 || Tommy Greene (10–7) || Rhéal Cormier (2–3) || Mitch Williams (26) || 16,210 || 66–72
|- style="background:#fbb"
| 139 || September 11 || Expos || 5–6 || Bill Sampen (8–4) || Wally Ritchie (0–2) || Barry Jones (12) || 13,501 || 66–73
|- style="background:#fbb"
| 140 || September 12 || Expos || 2–6 || Chris Nabholz (5–7) || Bruce Ruffin (3–7) || None || 13,243 || 66–74
|- style="background:#fbb"
| 141 || September 13 || Pirates || 6–8 || Stan Belinda (6–5) || Mitch Williams (10–5) || Rosario Rodríguez (4) || 29,107 || 66–75
|- style="background:#fbb"
| 142 || September 14 || Pirates || 3–5 || John Smiley (18–8) || Andy Ashby (0–4) || Vicente Palacios (3) || 27,412 || 66–76
|- style="background:#bfb"
| 143 || September 15 || Pirates || 8–3 || Tommy Greene (11–7) || Randy Tomlin (8–6) || Mitch Williams (27) || 35,560 || 67–76
|- style="background:#fbb"
| 144 || September 16 || Cardinals || 0–3 || Bob Tewksbury (10–11) || José DeJesús (10–6) || Lee Smith (41) || 13,892 || 67–77
|- style="background:#bfb"
| 145 || September 17 || Cardinals || 4–2 || Cliff Brantley (1–1) || Ken Hill (9–10) || Mitch Williams (28) || 14,059 || 68–77
|- style="background:#bfb"
| 146 || September 18 || Expos || 1–0 || Terry Mulholland (15–11) || Dennis Martínez (14–10) || None || 5,963 || 69–77
|- style="background:#bfb"
| 147 || September 19 || Expos || 5–4 (10) || Mitch Williams (11–5) || Scott Ruskin (3–4) || None || 5,297 || 70–77
|- style="background:#bfb"
| 148 || September 20 || @ Pirates || 8–3 || Tommy Greene (12–7) || Randy Tomlin (8–7) || None || 22,691 || 71–77
|- style="background:#fbb"
| 149 || September 21 || @ Pirates || 0–7 || Zane Smith (16–10) || José DeJesús (10–7) || None || 27,162 || 71–78
|- style="background:#fbb"
| 150 || September 22 || @ Pirates || 1–2 || Doug Drabek (15–13) || Cliff Brantley (1–2) || None || 33,662 || 71–79
|- style="background:#fbb"
| 151 || September 23 || @ Cubs || 3–10 || Greg Maddux (13–10) || Terry Mulholland (15–12) || None || 16,141 || 71–80
|- style="background:#bfb"
| 152 || September 24 || @ Cubs || 4–2 || Andy Ashby (1–4) || Mike Bielecki (13–11) || Mitch Williams (29) || 19,694 || 72–80
|- style="background:#bfb"
| 153 || September 25 || @ Cubs || 5–4 || Tommy Greene (13–7) || Shawn Boskie (4–9) || Mitch Williams (30) || 9,892 || 73–80
|- style="background:#fbb"
| 154 || September 27 || @ Mets || 4–6 || Pete Schourek (5–4) || José DeJesús (10–8) || John Franco (29) || 13,680 || 73–81
|- style="background:#bfb"
| 155 || September 28 || @ Mets || 6–2 || Cliff Brantley (2–2) || Anthony Young (2–4) || None || 16,967 || 74–81
|- style="background:#fbb"
| 156 || September 29 || @ Mets || 3–4 || Frank Viola (13–15) || Terry Mulholland (15–13) || John Franco (30) || 16,573 || 74–82
|- style="background:#bfb"
| 157 || September 30 || Cubs || 6–5 || Wally Ritchie (1–2) || Paul Assenmacher (7–7) || None || 12,109 || 75–82
|-

|- style="background:#bfb"
| 158 || October 1 || Cubs || 6–5 (13) || Bruce Ruffin (4–7) || Paul Assenmacher (7–8) || None || 12,291 || 76–82
|- style="background:#fbb"
| 159 || October 2 || Cubs || 0–1 || Greg Maddux (14–11) || José DeJesús (10–9) || None || 13,680 || 76–83
|- style="background:#bfb"
| 160 || October 4 || Mets || 5–4 (10) || Mitch Williams (12–5) || John Franco (5–9) || None || 20,720 || 77–83
|- style="background:#bfb"
| 161 || October 5 || Mets || 1–0 || Terry Mulholland (16–13) || Anthony Young (2–5) || None || 22,281 || 78–83
|- style="background:#fbb"
| 162 || October 6 || Mets || 0–7 || David Cone (14–14) || Andy Ashby' (1–5) || None || 29,676 || 78–84
|-

Roster

Player stats

Batting

Starters by positionNote: Pos = Position; G = Games played; AB = At bats; H = Hits; Avg. = Batting average; HR = Home runs; RBI = Runs batted inOther battersNote: G = Games played; AB = At bats; H = Hits; Avg. = Batting average; HR = Home runs; RBI = Runs batted inPitching

Starting pitchersNote: G = Games pitched; IP = Innings pitched; W = Wins; L = Losses; ERA = Earned run average; SO = StrikeoutsOther pitchersNote: G = Games pitched; IP = Innings pitched; W = Wins; L = Losses; ERA = Earned run average; SO = StrikeoutsRelief pitchersNote: G = Games pitched; W = Wins; L = Losses; SV = Saves; ERA = Earned run average; SO = Strikeouts Farm system 

References

External links
1991 Philadelphia Phillies season at Baseball Reference''

Philadelphia Phillies seasons
Philadelphia Phillies season
Philadelphia Phillies